Section Nine of the Constitution of South Africa guarantees equality before the law and freedom from discrimination to the people of South Africa. This equality right is the first right listed in the Bill of Rights. It prohibits both discrimination by the government and discrimination by private persons; however, it also allows for affirmative action to be taken to redress past unfair discrimination.

Text
Under the heading "Equality", the section states:

Notable cases
 President of the Republic of South Africa and Another v Hugo (1997) — a presidential decision to remit the sentences of imprisoned mothers with young children is not unfair discrimination against similarly-situated fathers.
 Prinsloo v Van der Linde and Another (1997) — a law which imposes a different onus of proof in civil cases involving forest fires does not deny equal protection of the law or amount to unfair discrimination.
 Larbi-Odam and Others v MEC for Education (North-West Province) and Another (1997) — a government policy prohibiting the employment of non-citizens as school teachers is unfair discrimination.
 City Council of Pretoria v Walker (1998) — a municipality's policy of charging a metered rate for water and electricity in formerly white areas but a flat rate per household in formerly black areas, with the effect that the residents of the white area pay higher rates on average, is not unfair discrimination, as the facilities provided to different areas are significantly different. However, the policy of suing to collect payments in arrears from residents of the white areas, but not suing similarly-situated residents of the black areas, is unfair discrimination.
 National Coalition for Gay and Lesbian Equality and Another v Minister of Justice and Others (1998) — the criminalisation of male same-sex sexual relations is unfair discrimination on the grounds of gender and sexual orientation.
 National Coalition for Gay and Lesbian Equality and Others v Minister of Home Affairs and Others (1999) — an immigration law which provides benefits to married couples discriminates on the basis of sexual orientation and must be extended to provide the same benefits to same-sex life partners.
 Hoffmann v South African Airways (2000) — a government-owned airline's policy of refusing to hire HIV-positive people as flight attendants violates the right to equality.
 Satchwell v President of the Republic of South Africa and Another (2002) — pension and retirement benefits provided to the spouses of judges must be equally provided to the same-sex life partners of judges.
 S v Jordan and Others (2002) — the gender-neutral criminalisation of prostitution does not discriminate unfairly against women.
 Khosa and Others v Minister of Social Development and Others (2003) — social welfare grants provided to South African citizens must also be provided to non-citizen permanent residents; to do otherwise is unfair discrimination.
 Bhe and Others v Magistrate, Khayelitsha, and Others (2004) — the rule of male primogeniture in the African customary law of inheritance discriminates unfairly against women and against younger children.
 Minister of Home Affairs and Another v Fourie and Another (2005) — the denial of marriage to same-sex couples is unfair discrimination on the basis of sexual orientation. (See same-sex marriage in South Africa.)

See also
 Promotion of Equality and Prevention of Unfair Discrimination Act, 2000

External links
 Bill of Rights – Government of South Africa
 Equality Courts

Constitution of South Africa
Anti-discrimination law in South Africa
Equality rights
Human rights in South Africa